The 1967 Australian Tourist Trophy was a motor race staged at the Surfers Paradise International Motor Circuit in Queensland, Australia on 21 May 1967. The race was open to Group A Sports Cars and was recognized by the Confederation of Australian Motor Sport as an Australian national title race. It was the eleventh Australian Tourist Trophy. The race was won by Frank Matich driving a Matich SR3 Oldsmobile.

Results

Race statistics
 Race distance : 40 laps, 80 miles
 The race commenced with a Le Mans start
 Number of starters: 14 
 Number of finishers: Not yet ascertained
 Winner's race time: 55:16.9
 Winner's race average speed: 87.2 mph
 Fastest lap: Frank Matich (Matich SR3): 1:30.0 (98.63 mph): Lap record for Sports Cars

References

Further reading
 Matich in spin-off at high speed, The Courier Mail, Friday, 19 May 1967, page 13

Australian Tourist Trophy
Tourist Trophy
Sports competitions in Queensland